Edwin P. Martz, Jr (1916 – September 25, 1967 or 1966) was an American physicist and astronomer.

He worked with William Pickering at Lowell Observatory in 1937 creating the first color photographs of Mars. He then worked at the Dearborn Observatory from 1939 until 1941. During the Second World War he was an optical engineer for the U.S. Army and worked on a tracking system for missiles using telescopes. After the war he continued to work in this field until 1958. He then became a research physicist at the Scripps Institute, and later accepted a position at the Jet Propulsion Laboratory in 1960. There he was responsible for the cameras on the Ranger spacecraft exploring the Moon. At the time of his death he had worked out the preliminary design for the camera system of the Voyager space mission. He died saving his research in a house fire. His papers were donated to the University of Chicago, his alma mater.

Honors 
Martz received the George W. Goddard Award in 1964. A crater on Mars was named in his honor.

External links
Biography

1916 births
1967 deaths
American astronomers
Optical engineers
United States Army personnel of World War II